Klaratoppen is a mountain in Oscar II Land at Spitsbergen, Svalbard. It has a height of 524 m.a.s.l. and is located on the ridge of Värmlandryggen. The mountain is named after the Swedish river Klarälven (in Värmland County).

References

Mountains of Spitsbergen